Brunkeberg is a village in the municipality of Kviteseid in Vestfold og Telemark county, Norway. European route E134 which runs from Drammen to Haugesund passes through the village. Brunkeberg Church (Brunkeberg Kirke) is a white cruciform church from 1790.

References

Kviteseid